Sky High Aviation Services is an airline based in Dominican Republic and operates scheduled flights in the Caribbean.

Services
Sky High Aviation Services operates scheduled and charter operations from the Dominican Republic to different destinations in the Caribbean.
The airline currently operates scheduled flights to 11 destinations in the Caribbean with charter flights available and future destinations expected.

Destinations

Scheduled destinations

Terminated

Fleet

Current fleet 
As of August 2022, the Sky High fleet consists of the following aircraft types:

Former fleet 
Over the years, Sky High has operated the following aircraft types:

Accidents and incidents
On April 20, 2015, a Piper PA-32, registered HI-957, took off from Punta Cana International Airport to Arroyo Barril Airport and crashed shortly after departure near the Punta Cana International Airport. All seven occupants on board were killed and the aircraft was destroyed by the fire.

On April 8, 2019, a British Aerospace 4100 Jetstream 41, registration HI1038, crash landed at Douglas Charles Airport, Commonwealth of Dominica, after a commercial flight from Santo Domingo, Dominican Republic. There were no fatalities.

References

Airlines of the Dominican Republic